Casey Dellacqua was the defending champion, having won the event in 2012, but decided not to defend her title the year after.

Ons Jabeur won the title, defeating An-Sophie Mestach in the final, 7–6(7–2), 6–2.

Seeds

Main draw

Finals

Top half

Bottom half

References 
 Main draw

Fukuoka International Women's Cup - Singles
Fukuoka International Women's Cup